The Robinson River is a river in the West Coast Region of the South Island of New Zealand. It is a tributary of the Upper Grey River and much of the river lies within the Lake Sumner Conservation Park.

Some older maps show the river as the Marchant River or the Marchant Robinson River.

A two-day tramping track known as the Robinson River track runs up the Robinson River before crossing a saddle via a poled route to join with the Lake Christabel track. There are two tramping huts maintained by the Department of Conservation beside the river.

The river is named for a superintendent of Nelson Province, John Perry Robinson (1809–1865).

References

Rivers of the West Coast, New Zealand
Rivers of New Zealand